The Winchester Downtown Commercial District is a  historic district that was listed on the National Register of Historic Places in 1982.  It included 114 contributing buildings.

It includes the both the 1853 Clark County Court House and the 1889 S. P. Kerr Building on the northwest corner of North Main Street and West Broadway.

References

Winchester, Kentucky
Historic districts on the National Register of Historic Places in Kentucky
National Register of Historic Places in Clark County, Kentucky